The metallic ringtail (Austrolestes cingulatus) is an Australian damselfly in the family Lestidae, 
It is widely distributed in Tasmania, Victoria and eastern New South Wales.
It is a thin, medium-sized damselfly with a green and gold or bluish green and gold coloration. Each abdominal segment is marked by a pale "ring"; this, combined with its glossy metallic coloration, give it its common name of metallic ringtail.

It is active through October to March in still-water bodies such as rivers, lakes, ponds, swamps, and alpine bogs, being usually found amongst vegetation.

Gallery

See also
 List of Odonata species of Australia

References

Lestidae
Insects of Australia
Endemic fauna of Australia
Insects described in 1839